Zenting is a municipality in the district of Freyung-Grafenau in Bavaria in Germany.

Location 
The municipality lies in the region of Danube Forest (Donau-Wald) in the middle of the Bavarian Forest. The village nestles in a sunny, south-facing bowl, above which the Brotjacklriegel (1,016 m) and Aschenstein (945 m) tower to the north. Zenting is located around 35 km NW of Passau, 13 km from Tittling, 18 km SW of  Grafenau, 26 km N of Vilshofen an der Donau and 15 km from the A 3 (Iggensbach exit).

References

Freyung-Grafenau